Thakura may refer to:

People with the surname
Bhaktisiddhanta Sarasvati Thakura, (1874–1937), preacher of Gaudiya Vaishnavism throughout India
Radhamohana Thakura (1697–1778), Vaishnava guru
Srivasa Thakura, close associate of Chaitanya Mahaprabhu and a member of the Pancha Tattva
Vrindavana Dasa Thakura (1507–1589), author of the Chaitanya Bhagavata, the biography of Chaitanya Mahaprabhu in the Bengali language

Other uses
Thakur (title), a feudal title of the Indian subcontinent

See also
 Thakur (disambiguation)
 
 Thakurai, a Muslim Rajput community in Bihar, India

de:Thakura